Joshua Smith (July 27, 1763 – April 12, 1845) was an American politician from New York.

Life
He was the son of Joshua Smith (1732–1814), and Hannah (Smith) Smith (1742–1793), and was born and died at the family estate in the Smithtown section of Hauppauge.

On December 23, 1784, he married Alma Blydenburgh (died 1790). On October 19, 1793, he married Ruth Smith (1769–1797), and they had two children. On April 4, 1798, he married Deborah Smith (1771–1809), and they had three children, among them State Senator Joshua B. Smith (1801–1860).

Joshua Smith was a member of the New York State Assembly (Suffolk Co.) in 1794, 1795, 1796, 1796–97, 1798–99 and 1825.

He was a delegate to the New York State Constitutional Convention of 1821.

He was a member of the New York State Senate (1st D.) from 1826 to 1829, sitting in the 49th, 50th, 51st and 52nd New York State Legislatures.

Sources
The New York Civil List compiled by Franklin Benjamin Hough (pages 58, 126f, 145, 168ff, 172 and 203; Weed, Parsons and Co., 1858)
Judge Joshua Smith at Long Island Surnames

External links
The Joshua Smith House (demolished 1960),  in Smithtown by Bradley Harris, Kiernan Lannon & Joshua Ruff (Arcadia Publishing, 2009;  ; pg. 90)

1763 births
1845 deaths
People from Smithtown, New York
New York (state) state senators
Members of the New York State Assembly
New York (state) Democratic-Republicans
People from Hauppauge, New York